Nangla Badi is a village located in the Khekra tehsil, Baghpat district in the Indian state of Uttar Pradesh. It is a rapidly developing village near Delhi. According to the historians, the ancestors of this village had participated actively in famous 1857 Revolutionary revolt. It is a JAATs dominanted village of DAGAR clan.  Nangla Badi Pin code is 250101. Khadi Hindi is the most speaking language here late Mansharam dagar,Retired ACP Shayam Singh, late Shri Bhullan Singh Verma, late Shri Shaligram Dagur, late Puran Singh, late Shri Abhay Ram , late Shri shibba Singh and Karan Singh 
are few well known names of the village. Agriculture is the main occupation of villager, besides this many are serving in Indiana army, Air Force, para military forces and Delhi & UP police.

Geography 
Nangla Badi's pin code is 250101. Postal head office is in Rly, Road Khekra .

History 
The village is divided into four Mohallas, each established by one of four founders who were active participants in the 1857 revolution.

Economy 
Agriculture is the primary occupation. Villagers also serve in the Indian Army, Indian Air Force, Para Military Forces, Delhi police and Uttar Pradesh police.

Demographics 

Nangla Badi has 2,380 residents with a literacy rate of 61.5%. Its population is 46.0% female. It is Jat dominant with members of the Dagar clan who speak Khadi Hindi.

References 

Villages in Bagpat district